James Morgan (1853 – 9 August 1933) was an Australian politician.

He was born in Hobart, but his family moved to New South Wales the following year. He attended Paddington National School in Sydney and became a compositor for the Sydney Morning Herald. He was then a gold miner before settling at Wonboyn Lake near Eden. On 16 May 1874 he married Mary Gowland, with whom he had four sons. In 1891 he was elected to the New South Wales Legislative Assembly as the Labor member for Bogan. He refused to sign the pledge, and in 1894 was the successful Protectionist candidate for Dubbo. He was defeated in 1895. Morgan died at Sydney in 1933.

References

1853 births
1933 deaths
Members of the New South Wales Legislative Assembly
Australian Labor Party members of the Parliament of New South Wales
Protectionist Party politicians